Bombus alpinus is a species of bumblebee. It is native to Europe and Eurasia, where it occurs in Austria, Finland, France, Germany, Italy, Norway, Romania, Russia, Sweden, and Switzerland.

This bee occurs in tundra habitat and in alpine climates on mountains. It can be found in mountain meadows, heaths, and willow woodlands. It collects pollen from mountain plants such as willows, bog blueberry, bird's-foot trefoil, and louseworts.

Some populations are threatened by habitat degradation caused by climate change.

References

Bumblebees
Hymenoptera of Asia
Hymenoptera of Europe
Vulnerable animals
Vulnerable biota of Europe
Vulnerable fauna of Asia
Bees described in 1758
Taxa named by Carl Linnaeus